Carlos Baker (May 5, 1909, Biddeford, Maine – April 18, 1987, Princeton, New Jersey) was an American writer, biographer and former Woodrow Wilson Professor of Literature at Princeton University. He received his B.A. from Dartmouth College and his M.A. from Harvard University. He then received his Ph.D. in English from Princeton University in 1940 after completing a doctoral dissertation titled "The influence of Spencer on Shelley's major poetry." Baker's published works included several novels and books of poetry and various literary criticisms and essays.

In 1969 he published the well-regarded scholarly biography of Ernest Hemingway, Ernest Hemingway: A Life Story.  However, in "Selected Letters of Martha Gellhorn," (Hemingway's third wife) she criticizes Baker's assertions concerning her affair and marriage to Hemingway, and indicates that Baker was frequently wrong about those matters she experienced personally, and which Baker wrote about. Ernest Hemingway never met Baker, according to Hemingway's fourth wife, Mary Welsh Hemingway, who also asserts in her 1976 book "How It Was" that Hemingway deliberately chose someone who never knew him.  Mary does not offer a specific reason for this choice, but Baker had published "Hemingway: The Writer as Artist" in 1952, which favorably treated Hemingway's work to that date.

Baker's other major works include biographies of Percy Bysshe Shelley and Ralph Waldo Emerson.

Baker taught biographer A. Scott Berg while Berg was an undergraduate at Princeton in the late 1960s.  Berg recalled that Baker "changed my life," and convinced him to quit acting to concentrate on his thesis, a study of editor Maxwell Perkins.  Berg eventually expanded his thesis into the National Book Award-winning biography Max Perkins: Editor of Genius (1978), which he dedicated in part to Baker.

Baker was elected to the American Philosophical Society in 1982.

References

External links
New York Times obituary of Baker

1909 births
1987 deaths
Dartmouth College alumni missing graduation year
Harvard University alumni
Princeton University alumni
People from Biddeford, Maine
Princeton University faculty
American literary critics
20th-century American non-fiction writers
Novelists from Maine
Novelists from New Jersey
Members of the American Philosophical Society